The 1920 United States presidential election in Oklahoma took place on November 2, 1920, as part of the 1920 United States presidential election which was held throughout all contemporary 48 states. Voters chose ten representatives, or electors to the Electoral College, who voted for president and vice president.

Background and vote
In its early years, Oklahoma was a “Solid South” Democratic state whose founding fathers like "Alfalfa Bill" Murray and Charles N. Haskell had disfranchised most of its black population via literacy tests and grandfather clauses, the latter of which would be declared unconstitutional in Guinn v. United States. Partly owing to the absence of the poll taxes found in other Southern states due to the strength of populism amongst the state’s white settlers, the state became a stronghold of the Socialist Party in the 1910s, especially in the southeast and the northwestern Plains.

However, despite being less stridently isolationist than states further north in the Great Plains, Oklahoma was nonetheless caught up in the hostility towards President Wilson and his various foreign policy proposals, as well as his inability to deal with large-scale domestic conflict. In early polls this was thought insufficient to split the state from the “Solid South”, but as it turned out a large swing caused the Democrats to lose the state, alongside Tennessee, for the first break in the “Solid South” since Reconstruction. The Republicans also elected a Senator and five Congressmen, so strong was the hostility towards Wilson.

Oklahoma voted for the Republican nominee, Ohio Senator Warren G. Harding, over the Democratic nominee, Ohio Governor James M. Cox and Socialist nominee Eugene V. Debs of Indiana. Harding ran with Massachusetts Governor Calvin Coolidge, while Cox ran with Assistant Secretary of the Navy Franklin D. Roosevelt of New York and Debs ran with Seymour Stedman of Illinois. Harding won the state by a margin of 5.5 percentage points. As a result of his win, Harding became the first Republican presidential candidate to win Oklahoma. This was the only election until 2008 in which Oklahoma did not vote the same way as Virginia.

Results

Results by county

See also
 United States presidential elections in Oklahoma

Notes

References

Oklahoma
1920
1920 Oklahoma elections